Ulf Peter "Mål-Otto" Ottosson (born 2 July 1968) is a Swedish former professional footballer who played as a striker. He has also coached various teams in Sweden. He is Degerfors IF's top goal scorer of all time with 205 goals.

Career 
Nicknamed "Mål-Otto" ("Goal-Otto"), Ottosson spent most of his playing career at Degerfors IF, having three different spells at the club in total. He had a brief spell in England on loan with Division One side Norwich City in 1997, scoring one goal in a 3–2 win away at Sheffield United. Manager Mike Walker decided against offering him a full-time contract, resulting in Ottoson's return to Sweden. He holds the record of scoring the most goals for Degerfors IF in their club history, a total of 205 goals.

At the end of his second spell with Degerfors, Ottosson was said to have started his own business making cabinets.

Coaching career 
Ottosson began coaching at Gullspångs IF in 2005, before taking up a player role Strömtorps IK in 2006. The following year, he became coach of Strömtorps, but was fired in September 2007 following a 2–0 loss against Kungsör BK. After taking a three-year-long timeout from football, Ottosson returned as a player-manager for Swedish 7th level club Ängebäck BK in 2011 but quit halfway through the 2013 season.

References

External links

Career information at ex-canaries.co.uk

1968 births
Living people
Swedish footballers
Ljungskile SK players
Norwich City F.C. players
IFK Norrköping players
FC Locarno players
Degerfors IF players
G.D. Chaves players
Expatriate footballers in Italy
Expatriate footballers in England
Expatriate footballers in Portugal
Expatriate footballers in Switzerland
Association football forwards
Swedish expatriate sportspeople in Portugal